The Vietnam Reform Revolutionary Party or the Việt Tân is an organisation that aims to establish liberal democracy and reform Vietnam through peaceful and political means.

The organization was founded on September 10, 1982 with Vice-admiral Hoàng Cơ Minh elected as chairman, which operated underground for two decades. On September 19, 2004, then-chairman Nguyễn Kim introduced Viet Tan as a public organization. Viet Tan's activities are rooted in the promotion of non-violent political change in Vietnam. 

The organization is outlawed in Vietnam and the government of Vietnam considers it "a terrorist force". The Office of the UN High Commissioner for Human Rights has described Viet Tan as "a peaceful organization advocating for democratic reform". The U.S. government has stated that there is 'no evidence' that it is a terrorist organization.

Objectives
The Viet Tan aims to establish democracy and reform Vietnam through peaceful means, focusing on empowering the Vietnamese people, supporting the development of civil society, and promoting pluralism in Vietnam. Specifically, Viet Tan seeks to roll back existing restrictions against basic rights by promoting a de facto free media, supporting grassroots movements, training and capacity building and engaging in international advocacy. Viet Tan sees the strength and resources of the Vietnamese people as the impetus for achieving political change and restoring civil rights.

Non-violent struggle
Viet Tan embraces the non-violent struggle approach to reform. The organization believes that change has to come from within Vietnam and come from the bottom up. Human Rights Watch have repeatedly stated that the organization "has worked for peaceful political reform, democracy, and human rights in Vietnam".

The organization has outlined the following steps to democratizing Vietnam:

Improving Social Welfare & Restoring Civil Rights
Promoting Pluralism
Building Collective Strength
Expanding the Knowledge Base
Investing in the Future Generation
Lobbying International Support
Strengthening the Overseas Vietnamese Community
Building the Foundation to Reform Vietnam
Protecting National Interests and Territorial Integrity
Restoring Truth to Recent History

In a radio interview with Australia Radio station 2SER, Viet Tan representative Phong Nguyen states that "our mission is to promote human rights, democracy and to end social injustice by peaceful nonviolent means based civic participation", though he recognizes that the Vietnamese government regards them as a terrorist organization, despite a lack of evidence.

In a statement released in 2013 following the conviction of Vietnamese dissidents accused of being members of Viet Tan, the organization states that it "believes that gaining an understanding of nonviolent civil resistance, digital security and leadership skills are both empowering and the right of every free individual."

Reactions
The organization is outlawed in Vietnam and the government of Vietnam considers it "a terrorist force". However, the Vietnamese government has never found Viet Tan members carrying weapons. 

The Office of the UN High Commissioner for Human Rights has described Viet Tan as "a peaceful organization advocating for democratic reform".

The U.S. government, most notably former U.S. Ambassador Michael Michalak, has stated that there is 'no evidence' that it is a terrorist organization.

Membership
Viet Tan has members and supporters throughout Vietnam and around the world, its network inside Vietnam comprises intellectuals, university students, and workers. While membership is by-invitation-only, Viet Tan does send out mass emails to people in Vietnam to recruit potential members.

Viet Tan held its 6th Party Congress in September 2006. Members were elected the Central Committee headed by Đỗ Hoàng Điềm as chairman and Ly Thai Hung as general secretary.

History

Beginnings: 1982–2004

On September 10, 1982, the National United Front for the Liberation of Vietnam (NUFRONLIV) was founded by various groups in Vietnam, with Hoàng Cơ Minh elected as president. Two years later, this group was then later reorganized into Viet Tan, when it became a worldwide underground movement. While the former had the primary aim to topple the communist regime through a popular uprising, the latter aims at renovating Vietnam through political and peaceful means.NUFRONLIV was later dissolved due to accusations of financial fraud. 

During the period of 1982 to 1987 Hoang Co Minh also served as the organization's chair, until he was ambushed by Vietnamese soldiers while leading a group of members into Vietnam. In the period that followed, Viet Tan remained an underground organization with undisclosed projects and campaigns.

Going public in 2004

On September 19, 2004, in a highly publicized event in Berlin, Germany, the organization stepped out as a public organization, announcing the dissolution of the NUFRONLIV, and a recommitment to establish democracy in Vietnam through peaceful means.

In September 2006, Viet Tan sent members to testify before the Congressional Human Rights Caucus in Washington, D.C..

On May 29, 2007, chairman Đỗ Hoàng Điềm was invited by US president George W. Bush together with three other Vietnamese-American activists to the White House on a meeting about Vietnam's increasingly harsh treatment of anti-government activists and an upcoming visit by Vietnam's president Nguyen Minh Triet to the United States. During the 45-minute meeting, Đỗ Hoàng Điềm urged the president to increase pressure on Vietnam to respect human rights and asked for the United States to support openly democratic forces to bring change to Hanoi. During Nguyen Minh Triet's visit to the US, Đỗ Hoàng Điềm also met with House Speaker Nancy Pelosi shortly before her meeting with the Vietnamese president to stress the importance of raising the issue of Vietnam's poor human rights record.

2009 testimony before Parliament of Australia
On March 19, 2009 Viet Tan members (including Đỗ Hoàng Điềm) also testified before the Parliament of Australia Human Rights Sub-Committee on Vietnam's recent development on worker's rights abuses, religious freedom and arbitrary arrests. This was also followed up in November 2009, when Viet Tan organized a democracy dinner with Australian politicians Alistair Coe and George Lemon who both received honorary member status for Viet Tan given their support and work for the non-violent struggle for democracy in Vietnam

2010 public appearances in Hanoi

On March 14, 2010 Viet Tan members gathered in the Vietnamese capital Hanoi, Vietnam to assert Vietnam's maritime claims to the Paracel and Spratly Islands. They distributed T-shirts and hats with slogans that were prohibited by the Vietnamese government.

A similar protest against China's actions over disputed maritime territories occurred on October 8, 2010 with approximately 70 members of Viet Tan in attendance in Hanoi, Vietnam. The members said it was their responsibility as citizens to speak out, and passed out T-shirts and hats calling for the government to defend its right to sovereignty over disputed islands in the South China Sea.

Arrests

2007 arrests

On November 17, 2007, three Viet Tan members, US citizens Nguyen Quoc Quan, a mathematics researcher, and Truong Van Ba, a Hawaiian restaurant owner, and Frenchwoman Nguyen Thi Thanh Van, a contributor to Viet Tan's Radio Chan Troi Moi radio show, were arrested in Ho Chi Minh City. At the time, they were leading a "democracy seminar" and preparing pro-democracy pamphlets, when 20 security officers raided the house. In addition, Thai citizen Somsak Khunmi and two Vietnamese nationals, Nguyen The Vu, a trader, and his brother Nguyen Trong Khiem were also arrested. Three days later, on November 20, 2007, Vietnamese security police arrested Nguyen Viet Trung, a Vietnamese citizen, in Phan Thiết. Born 1979, Nguyen Viet Trung is a businessman and younger brother of Nguyen The Vu. The arrests were not officially confirmed by the Vietnamese government until November 22, 2007. During the press briefing, officials declined to state which laws the detained individuals have broken, nor released any information about Nguyen Quoc Quan, whose whereabouts remained unknown for a week.

In response to the arrest, Viet Tan launched a worldwide awareness campaign under the name of Free Them Now, that included a petition to request the US, French and Thai government for assistance in demanding an immediate release of the individuals. Coinciding with the International Human Rights Day on December 10, rallies were organized in Paris, Sydney and Washington, D.C..

On November 24, 2007, Vietnamese security police released university student Nguyen Trong Khiem after detaining him for a week without cause. On December 12, 2007, after weeks of protests and appeals by U.S. lawmakers and international pro-democracy movements, Vietnam released American citizen Truong Van Ba shortly after the U.S. ambassador Michael Michalak demanded to see evidence of terrorism or other charges to justify their detention. Nguyen Quoc Quan remained detained in Vietnam, with the U.S. Consulate allowed to visit him once per month. However, family visits were not allowed. His wife was granted a visa to visit him in January 2008, though the Vietnamese consulate revoked the visa one week prior her scheduled trip.

On March 12, 2008, chairman of Viet Tan, Đỗ Hoàng Điềm, appeared before the US Senate Foreign Relations Committee's subcommittee on East Asian and Pacific Affairs along with Nguyen Quoc Quan's wife to appeal to lawmakers to confront the issue.

During a behind-closed-doors trial in Vietnam on May 13, 2008, Nguyen Quoc Quan was sentenced to 6 months in prison, but since he had already served that time, was released on May 17, 2008 and deported back to the United States. Nguyen The Vu was released immediately, and Somsak Kunmi will serve another three months before he will be released. Other than the sentences, the presiding judge would not release any further detail of the trial.

2008 arrests
Following the 2007 arrests, three additional Viet Tan members, Nguyen Thi Xuan Trang, a medical doctor from Switzerland, Mai Huu Bao, an electrical engineer from the United States and past Executive Board Member of the Union of Vietnamese Student Associations of Southern California as well as Nguyen Tan Anh, a manager of a health-care non-profit from Australia, attempted a visit of Nguyen Quoc Quan in Ho Chi Minh City. On April 4, 2008, the three Viet Tan members visited the Ministry of Public Security detention center in Ho Chi Minh City, but were detained by security police. The three were released two days later and expelled from Vietnam.

2010 arrests

In July and August 2010, a new series of arrests by the Vietnamese government was made. The arrests included Pham Minh Hoang, a 55-year-old French-educated lecturer in applied mathematics at the Ho Chi Minh City Institute of Technology, Duong Kim Khai (a pastor in the Mennonite Church), Tran Thi Thuy (a merchant) and Nguyen Thanh Tam (a farmer). Hoang's wife believed her husband was arrested because he supported the protests against controversial Chinese-run bauxite mines in Vietnam's Central Highlands.
Hoang remains in police custody since August 13, 2010. Reporters Without Borders and the Committee of Concerned Scientists condemned the government's consistent use of conspiracy theories to arrest dissidents.

Following a peaceful demonstration of Viet Tan party members in Hanoi to affirming Vietnamese sovereignty over the Paracel and Spratly Island, Mrs. Hong Vo, a 53-year-old social worker from Melbourne, Australia was arrested in the evening of October 10, 2010. The arrest occurred at the airport, as Mrs. Vo was boarding a plan to return to Australia. Her son was on a phone call with her, when the phone call ended abruptly.

After the Australian consulate in Vietnam intervened in the case, Hong Vo was released from prison on October 21, 2010 and immediately expelled from the country without the possibility for her to ever return.

2011 arrests
Following the peaceful demonstration with Vietnamese farmers who protest the government's confiscation of their land, Viet Tan members Jennifer Truong, Nguyen Ly Trong and Nguyen Quang Khanh were arrested in Ho Chi Minh City on March 16, 2011. While the arrest was confirmed by the Vietnamese police, no further information was provided.

In May 2011, three Viet Tan members along with four other land activists were tried during a one-day, closed trial and sentenced to prison for two to seven years.
The activists, including Tran Thi Thuy and Duong Kim Khai were lobbying for land rights in Bến Tre and offered legal advice to farmers whose land has been confiscated by the government. During the trial, the defendants were denied access to a lawyer, and members of the US Congress, led by Representative Ed Royce, wrote a letter asking for their release.

2012 arrests

On April 17, 2012, Nguyen Quoc Quan was arrested again at Tan Son Nhat International Airport in Ho Chi Minh City. Government officials did not confirm his arrest until five days later. He is detained on charges of terrorism and for planning to "instigate a demonstration" during the anniversary of the Fall of Saigon. He is being detained for at least four months. According to his wife, he was planning to visit his younger sister and "talk about democracy and the rule of law". The U.S. consulate in Vietnam has confirmed that he has been arrested, but no formal charges have been filed and has not been granted a lawyer. Six members of the U.S. Congress signed a letter to U.S. Secretary of State Hillary Clinton and urged the State Department to call for Dr. Quan's immediate release on grounds that the Vietnamese government is "abusing its vague national security provisions as the pretext to arrest and detain individuals who peacefully advocate for religious and political freedom." Following intense US pressure, he was then deported on January 30, 2013 after spending nine months in prison.

2013 convictions

14 activists, many associated with the Roman Catholic Redemptionist movement, arrested in 2011 after attending Viet Tan training in Thailand, were convicted of subversion after a two-day trial in Vinh, in Nghệ An Province, and sentenced in January 2013 for periods ranging from 3 to 13 years. Defendants included Dang Xuan Dieu, Dang Ngoc Minh, Ho Duc Hoa, Ho Van Oanh, Paulus Lê Sơn, Nguyen Dang Minh Man, Nguyen Dang Vinh Phuc, Nguyen Dinh Cuong, Nguyen Van Duyet, Nguyen Van Oai, Nguyen Xuan Oanh, Nong Hung Anh, Thai Van Dung, and Tran Minh Nhat. During this time, Viet Tan chairman Đỗ Hoàng Điềm went on public media including Saigon Broadcasting Television Network as well as Al Jazeera to speak out against this "blatant crackdown."

Campaigns

Internet Freedom Campaign
In response to Vietnam's appeal to Internet companies Microsoft, Google and Yahoo to work with the Vietnamese government to restrict blogging about dissident material and hand over information that could lead to arrests, Viet Tan launched the "Internet Freedom Campaign". Under this campaign, Viet Tan released a report. Through this lobbying campaign, 16 members of the US Congress have already co-signed a joint letter to the CEOs of each company to express their concerns about "the worsening Internet restrictions in Vietnam.".

In October 2010, the organization also started the No Firewall portal, that provided documentation on digital security and how to circumvent the Vietnamese government firewall.

In April 2012, the organization obtained a decree entitled Decree on the Management, Provision, Use of Internet Services and Information Content Online that was drafted by the Vietnamese government that would ask internet companies to censor blogs, release blogger information and possibly house data centers in Vietnam for the purpose of censorship and regulation of social media. Viet Tan published an editorial describing the draft policy and called for US companies to resist it. Reporters Without Borders later confirmed that the decree exists and that it was meant to be enacted in June 2012.

Save Tây Nguyên campaign
In 2009, Viet Tan has been very vocal about the planned bauxite mining in the central area of Tây Nguyên. Under an agreement between the Chinese government and the Vietnamese Prime Minister Nguyễn Tấn Dũng, Chinese companies were allowed access to the central highlands of Tây Nguyên for bauxite mining. Environmental concerns about bauxite mining sparked widespread international opposition among scientists, intellectuals and former soldiers. Prominent Vietnamese lawyer Le Cong Dinh was very vocal about the bauxite mining, and as a result was arrested on June 13, 2009 by the Vietnamese police force.

Free Thuy-Nhan-Nghien campaign
In response to the imprisonment of human rights and democracy activists Tran Khai Thanh Thuy, Le Thi Cong Nhan and Pham Thanh Nghien, Viet Tan launched the Free Thuy-Nhan-Nghien campaign in March 2010. The campaign included a call to spread awareness on social media outlets.

One Million Against 79 campaign
With many Vietnamese pro-democracy activists being arrested under article 79 of the Vietnamese penal code that bans "carrying out activities aimed at overthrowing the people's administration." Viet Tan has started the One Million Against 79 campaign that solicits videos from individuals voicing their opposition against article 79. Reporters Without Borders also noted the government's systematic use of conspiracy theories and article 79 to arrest dissidents.

Programs

New Horizon Radio
Since 1992, Viet Tan has operated a daily radio broadcast to Vietnam under the name "New Horizon Radio" (Radio Chân Trời Mới). The program airs every night from 8:30pm to 9:00pm on AM 1503. Despite efforts to jam the broadcast by the government, it can be heard in most areas of the country. The episodes are also available online as a podcast.

Friends of Viet Tan
Viet Tan started a social networking outreach program through the Friends of Viet Tan community that allows like-minded activists to follow news and activities about Vietnam and Viet Tan and also participate in the discussion. The program was first launched as a Facebook application that allowed other users to suggest their own newsworthy articles and references to a main feed that was replicated to many other websites. The application also syndicated Radio Chân Trời Mới as a podcast, and in 2009 also introduced a vodcast.

Digital activism seminars
On November 14–15, 2009, Viet Tan organized a seminar on "Digital Activism: A Tool for Change in Vietnam" held at Georgetown University, in Washington, D.C. Incidentally, in the same week, the Vietnamese government decided to block Facebook through its internet firewall. In response, seminar attendees produced viral videos and documentation on how to circumvent Vietnam's firewall to access Facebook as well as a viral video called Facebook Back that uses modified lyrics of Justin Timberlake's Sexyback

The same seminar was repeated February 27–28, 2010 at Chapman University in Orange, California, which was co-sponsored by the Asian Pacific Law Student Association and the Vietnamese American Law Student Association.

The seminar also took place at Harvard University from October 16–17, 2010.

On March 9, 2010, Viet Tan Spokesman Hoang Tu Duy presented on "Digital Activism in Vietnam" at the Geneva Summit for Human Rights, Tolerance and Democracy and was one of the panelist to discuss 'Next Generation: Young Rights Defenders and the Blogosphere'.

See also
2011 crackdown on Vietnamese youth activists
2013 conviction of 14 Vietnamese dissidents

References

External links

 
Member of Viet Tan in Vietnam interviewed by Australian Broadcasting Corporation
Radio Chan Troi Moi – Viet Tan's internet radio program
Free Them Now – international campaign to release Viet Tan members
Viet Tan's blog on Radio Chan Troi Moi

Interview with Viet Tan chairman Do Hoang Diem on Saigon Broadcasting Television Network – Part 1 and Part 2
Interview with Viet Tan chairman Do Hoang Diem on Al Jazeera

Anti-communism in Vietnam
Banned political parties in Vietnam
Nationalist parties in Vietnam
Organizations designated as terrorist by Vietnam
Overseas Vietnamese organizations
Vietnamese community organizations
Vietnamese democracy movements